Birgir Björn Pétursson (born 24 January 1986) is an Icelandic former basketball player.

Playing career

KFÍ (2007–09)
After playing for Njarðvík and Þór Þorlákshöfn during the 2006–2007 season, Birgir joined his hometown team KFÍ again in 2007. During his second season he averaged 9.2 points and 9.1 rebounds and helped his team reach the playoffs where they lost 2-1 to Valur in the first round.

Stjarnan (2009–11)
Birgir signed with Úrvalsdeild karla club Stjarnan in 2009 and won the Icelandic Super Cup with the team in October of that year. Unhappy with his playing time during his second season, Birgir left the club in January 2011.

Valur (2011–14)
Birgir joined Division I club Valur in January 2011 and helped the team to get promoted to the Úrvalsdeild in 2013. On November 14, 2013, he grabbed a career high 25 rebounds against Þór Þorlákshöfn. For the 2013–2014 season he averaged 14.0 points and 9.9 rebounds (11th in league ) but was unable to prevent the team to get relegated back to Division I.

KFÍ (2014–2015)
Birgir rejoined KFÍ in the summer of 2014. In September he scored a career high 31 points against Tindastóll  which eventually ended second in the Icelandic Premier League. For the season he averaged 17.8 points and 12.5 rebounds, both career highs, while shooting 52% from the field.

UBC Münster (2015)
In September 2015 Birgir signed a three-month contract with UBC Münster in Germany. He left the club at the end of the contract in December.

KFÍ (2016)
In January 2016 he signed back with KFÍ until the end of the season. In 10 games Birgir averaged 14.0 points and 9.7 rebounds, helping the club stave off religation.

Valur (2016–2018)
Birgir joined Valur prior to the 2016–2017 season. The club finished third in Division I and achieved promotion to Úrvalsdeild after defeating Breiðablik and Hamar in the promotion playoffs. The club also had good success in the Icelandic cup, beating three Úrvalsdeild teams before finally bowing out for the eventual champions, KR, in the final four.

Álftanes (2019–2020)
After missing all the 2018–2019 season due to a concussion, Birgir signed with Álftanes in August 2019. For the season, he averaged 10.1 points and 5.7 rebounds before it was canceled due to the coronavirus pandemic in Iceland.

National team career
In 2006, Birgir played 8 games for Iceland in the U20 European Championship Men (Division B).

Birgir was among the 30 players selected for the Iceland national basketball team training camp for the summer of 2014. He was not among the final 14 players selected for the EuroBasket 2015 qualifier.

Career statistics

Icelandic Domestic Leagues

|-
| style="text-align:left;"| 2003-2004
| style="text-align:left;"| KFÍ
| 2 || - || 1.5 || 1.000 || .500 || - || 0.0 || 0.0 || 0.0 || 0.0 || 1.0 || -
|-
| style="text-align:left;"| 2004-2005
| style="text-align:left;"| KFÍ
| 20 || - || 9.1 || .333 || .000 || .688 || 2.1 || 0.4 || 0.4 || 0.3 || 1.5 || -
|-
| style="text-align:left;"| 2005-2006
| style="text-align:left;"| KFÍ
| 17 || - || 19.4 || .500 || .000 || .544 || 6.3 || 0.3 || 0.9 || 0.5 || 8.4 || -
|-
| style="text-align:left;"| 2006-2007
| style="text-align:left;"| Þór Þorlákshöfn
| 22 || - || 4.4 || .350 || .000 || .900 || 0.5 || 0.0 || 0.1 || 0.1 || 1.0 || -
|-
| style="text-align:left;"| 2007-2008
| style="text-align:left;"| KFÍ
| 15 || - || 17.6 || .565 || .000 || .680 || 4.5 || 0.4 || 0.6 || 0.1 || 5.8 || -
|-
| style="text-align:left;"| 2008-2009
| style="text-align:left;"| KFÍ
| 20 || 16 || 25.5 || .629 || .250 || .612 || 8.5 || 0.9 || 0.5 || 0.7 || 8.8 || 14.3
|-
| style="text-align:left;"| 2009-2010
| style="text-align:left;"| Stjarnan
| 21 || 0 || 8.1 || .621 || .000 || .650 || 2.5 || 0.1 || 0.4 || 0.3 || 2.3 || 3.9
|-
| style="text-align:left;"| 2010-2011
| style="text-align:left;"| Stjarnan
| 10 || 0 || 5.5 || .357 || .000 || .600 || 3.0 || 0.5 || 0.1 || 0.1 || 1.3 || 3.0
|-
| style="text-align:left;"| 2010-2011
| style="text-align:left;"| Valur
| 11 || 2 || 12.2 || .559 || .000 || .524 || 4.2 || 0.4 || 0.3 || 0.5 || 4.5 || 6.2
|-
| style="text-align:left;"| 2011-2012
| style="text-align:left;"| Valur
| 22 || 16 || 26.4 || .599 || .000 || .500 || 7.8 || 0.8 || 0.8 || 0.5 || 10.6 || 13.7
|-
| style="text-align:left;"| 2012-2013
| style="text-align:left;"| Valur
| 23 || 21 || 29.0 || .621 || .000 || .647 || 9.2 || 1.0 || 1.1 || 0.6 || 13.5 || 18.1
|-
| style="text-align:left;"| 2013-2014
| style="text-align:left;"| Valur
| 22 || 22 || 31.1 || .539 || .000 || .718 || 9.9 || 1.2 || 0.7 || 1.0 || 14.0 || 18.3
|-
| style="text-align:left;"| 2014-2015
| style="text-align:left;"| KFÍ
| 21 || 19 || 33.5 || .520 || .333 || .736 || 12.5 || 1.4 || 0.9 || 1.0 || 17.7 || 22.3
|-
| style="text-align:left;"| 2015-2016
| style="text-align:left;"| KFÍ
| 10 || 10 || 29.4 || .524 || .000 || .667 || 9.7 || 1.0 || 1.2 || 0.5 || 14.0 || 17.9
|-
| style="text-align:left;"| 2016-2017
| style="text-align:left;"| Valur
| 24 || 23 || 29.4 || .634 || .333 || .811 || 9.0 || 1.8 || 0.8 || 0.8 || 13.4|| 20.0
|-
| style="text-align:left;"| 2017-2018
| style="text-align:left;"| Valur
| 22 || 20 || 18.1 || .542 || 1.000 || .625 || 5.2 || 0.8 || 0.4 || 0.3 || 5.3|| 8.8
|-
| style="text-align:left;"| 2019-2020
| style="text-align:left;"| Álftanes
| 23 || 13 || 22.5 || .568 || - || .844 || 5.7 || 0.5 || 0.6 || 0.3 || 10.1|| 12.4

References

External links
KKÍ.is player profile
Eurobasket.com profile
Fibaeurope.com profile

1986 births
Living people
Birgir Bjorn Petursson
Centers (basketball)
Birgir Bjorn Petursson
Birgir Bjorn Petursson
Birgir Bjorn Petursson
Birgir Bjorn Petursson
Birgir Bjorn Petursson
Birgir Bjorn Petursson
Birgir Bjorn Petursson
Birgir Bjorn Petursson
Birgir Bjorn Petursson